Pierrick Cros (born 23 June 1991) is a French footballer who plays as a goalkeeper.

Overview
Cros is a French youth international and has served as the goalkeeper at under-16 and under-17 level. On 30 October 2010, Cros made his professional debut with Sochaux in a league match against Lyon; Sochaux lost the match 2–1.

References

External links
 
 
 

Living people
1991 births
Sportspeople from Albi
French footballers
French expatriate footballers
Association football goalkeepers
FC Sochaux-Montbéliard players
Royal Excel Mouscron players
Red Star F.C. players
Ligue 1 players
Ligue 2 players
Belgian Pro League players
France youth international footballers
Expatriate footballers in Belgium
Footballers from Occitania (administrative region)
French expatriate sportspeople in Belgium